The Farini government of Italy held office from 8 December 1862 until 24 March 1863, a total of 106 days, or 3 months and 16 days.

Government parties
The government was composed by the following parties:

Composition

References

Italian governments
1862 establishments in Italy